The Fruitful Vine is a 1911 novel by the British writer Robert Hichens.

Adaptation
In 1921 it was made into a silent film of the same title directed by Maurice Elvey and starring Basil Rathbone.

References

Bibliography
 Goble, Alan. The Complete Index to Literary Sources in Film. Walter de Gruyter, 1999.
 Vinson, James. Twentieth-Century Romance and Gothic Writers. Macmillan, 1982.

1911 British novels
Novels by Robert Hichens
British novels adapted into films